The 1929 UCLA Bruins football team was an American football team that represented the University of California, Los Angeles (UCLA) as a member of the Pacific Coast Conference (PCC) during the 1929 college football season. In their fifth year under head coach William H. Spaulding, the Bruins compiled a 4–4 record (1-3 against PCC opponents), finished in sixth place in the PCC, and were outscored by a total of 190 to 121.

The season opened with the first game played between UCLA and USC, ending in a 76–0 victory for USC. UCLA's lone conference win was against Montana, 14–0, in the last game of the season.

Schedule

Roster
The following is a partial list of student-athletes on UCLA's football roster during the 1929 season.

Harold Bishop
Ansel Breiniman
Carl Brown
Jack Bryan
Ted Dennis
Ted Duffy
John Duncan
Norm Duncan
George Forster
Marion French
Alfred Gibson
Maurice Goodstein
Aubrey Grossman
Russell Huse
Don Jacobson
Glenwood Lloyd
Lloyd McMillan
Edward Milum
Richard Mulhaupt
Glenn Nelson
Harvey Nelson
Eugene Noble
Beverly Ogden
Bob Rasmus
Robert Reinhard
John Remsberg
Howard Roberts
Jerry Russom
Clifton Simpson
Arthur Smith
Chester Smith
Edward Solomon
Howard Stoeffen
Rueben Thoe
Leonard Wellendorf
Meyer Zimmerman

References

UCLA
UCLA Bruins football seasons
UCLA Bruins football